Hugo Gabriel Silveira Pereira (born 26 March 1993) is a Uruguayan footballer who plays for Rentistas as a forward.

Career

Club
On 13 February 2018, FC Kairat announced the signing of Silveira on a season-long loan deal.

Career statistics

Club

References

1993 births
Living people
Uruguayan footballers
Uruguayan expatriate footballers
Association football forwards
Argentine Primera División players
Chilean Primera División players
Uruguayan Primera División players
Kazakhstan Premier League players
Liga MX players
FC Kairat players
Club Atlético Tigre footballers
Club Atlético Patronato footballers
Querétaro F.C. footballers
Ñublense footballers
C.A. Rentistas players
Uruguayan expatriate sportspeople in Chile
Uruguayan expatriate sportspeople in Argentina
Uruguayan expatriate sportspeople in Kazakhstan
Uruguayan expatriate sportspeople in Mexico
Expatriate footballers in Chile
Expatriate footballers in Argentina
Expatriate footballers in Kazakhstan
Expatriate footballers in Mexico